Gulper eel may refer to:

Pelican eel (Eurypharynx pelecanoides), a species of deep-sea eel
Saccopharynx, a genus of deep-sea eels